TBU may refer to:

 Vought TBU Sea Wolf, a U.S. World War II torpedo bomber
 Fuaamotu International Airport (IATA airport code) in Tonga
 Telephone balance unit, device to convert unbalanced to balanced audio signals
 Tirana Business University a university in Albania
 Tokushima Bunri University, in Tokushima, Japan
 Tomas Bata University in Zlín, Czech Republic